McDaid is a surname. Notable people with the surname include:

Danny McDaid (born 1941), Irish runner
David McDaid (born 1990), Northern Irish footballer
Hugh McDaid, Northern Irish football manager
James Pat McDaid, Irish Gaelic footballer and politician
Jim McDaid (born 1949), Irish medical doctor and politician
John McDaid (1909-?), Irish footballer
Johnny McDaid, Northern Irish musician
Kevin McDaid (born 1984), Nigerian-born British singer
Kevin McDaid, Northern Irish murder victim
Richard McDaid (born 1975), Irish cricketer
Sean McDaid (born 1986), English-born Scottish footballer

See also
McDaid's Football Special, an Irish soft drink